Valdosta State Prison is a Georgia Department of Corrections state prison for men located in Valdosta, Lowndes County, Georgia.

The facility first opened in 1959, and has a maximum capacity of 1312 inmates held at close security level.

Notable Inmates
Ashley Diamond, prison and LGBTQ rights activist
Guy Heinze Jr. - Mass Murderer. Sentenced to life without the possibility of parole for killing his father and seven members of his extended family.

References

Prisons in Georgia (U.S. state)
Buildings and structures in Lowndes County, Georgia
1959 establishments in Georgia (U.S. state)